Bastiaan Tamminga (born June 9, 1981) is a former Dutch swimmer who specializes in the 50 m events of the backstroke, butterfly and freestyle. He trained by former world champion Marcel Wouda alongside olympic champions Maarten van der Weijden and Hinkelien Schreuder.

Swimming career
Tamminga made his international debut at the European SC Championships 2001 in Antwerp. In the following years he appeared on many international tournaments especially in short course. At the European SC Championships 2007 in Debrecen, Hungary he won his only international medal, a bronze, in the 4×50 m medley relay alongside Nick Driebergen, Robin van Aggele and Mitja Zastrow.

2008
At the European Championships in March 2008 he finished 18th in the 50 m butterfly and 30th in the 100 m butterfly. In April he competed in the 2008 FINA Short Course World Championships and finished 10th in the 50 m butterfly, breaking the national record, and 21st in the 100 m. In the 4×100 m medley relay he swam a national record together with Robin van Aggele, Joeri Verlinden and Mitja Zastrow, finishing 8th in the final.

Personal bests

References

External links 
Official Website

1981 births
Living people
Dutch male freestyle swimmers
Dutch male backstroke swimmers
Dutch male butterfly swimmers
Sportspeople from Delft
21st-century Dutch people